Michael McFarlane may refer to:

Mick McFarlane (EastEnders), a fictional character from the BBC soap opera EastEnders
Mick McFarlane (footballer) (1908–1981), Australian rules footballer
Mike McFarlane (born 1960), British athlete

See also
Michael McFarland (disambiguation)